Franco Armani (born 16 October 1986) is an Argentine professional footballer who plays as a goalkeeper for Argentine Primera División club River Plate and the Argentina national team.

Club career
Franco Armani left Deportivo Merlo in 2010 for Medellin's Atletico Nacional. He stayed for 8 seasons and became their first choice goalkeeper. He was described as a hero to the Nacional fans, particularly being praised as an effective and reliable shot-stopper. Armani would go on to win thirteen trophies, including the Copa Libertadores – South America's Champions League – against Independiente del Valle in 2016.

In January 2018, River Plate paid Armani's buyout clause to Nacional, a reported $3 million. On 11 January 2018, he signed a three-year contract with Los Millonarios, which was renewed for an additional year in May 2018.

On 14 March 2018, he was named man of the match in River's 2–0 triumph over arch rivals Boca Juniors for the 2017 Supercopa Argentina. The man of the match award was sponsored by the fast food company Burger King and he was literally 'crowned' on the pitch after the game.

International career

Armani married a Colombian and applied for citizenship. Colombia were reportedly interested in naturalising Armani so that he could play for their national team; however, he wished to return to Argentina to press his case for a World Cup berth with the nation of his birth.

Armani has impressed for River, being described by Olé as a goalkeeper who wins matches.

In June 2018, Armani was named in Argentina's 23-man squad for the 2018 FIFA World Cup in Russia by manager Jorge Sampaoli. On 26 June, he made his international debut starting in place of Willy Caballero for Argentina's final group match against Nigeria; Argentina advanced to the second round as group runners-up following a 2–1 victory. On 30 June, Armani started in the Round of 16 match against France, which saw Argentina eliminated from the tournament following a 4–3 defeat.

He was named in Argentina's final 23-man squad for the 2019 Copa América by manager Lionel Scaloni. He played every minute of the tournament as Argentina claimed the bronze medal by finishing third after defeating Chile 2–1 in the third place play-off match.

He was named in Argentina's 28-man squad for the 2021 Copa América. He made his only appearance in Argentina's final group match, where they defeated Bolivia 4–1 to progress to the next round. He remained understudy to Emiliano Martínez in the remaining matches as Argentina won the tournament by defeating Brazil 1–0 in the final.

On 1 June 2022, Armani remained as an unused substitute as Argentina won 3–0 against reigning European Champions Italy at Wembley Stadium in the 2022 Finalissima.

He was named in Argentina's final 26-man squad for the 2022 FIFA World Cup in Qatar by Scaloni. He did not play a single minute in the tournament, with Emiliano Martinez as first-choice, as Argentina won the World Cup by defeating France 4–2 in a penalty shoot-out to win the final.

Career statistics

Club

1 Includes Copa Libertadores and Copa Sudamericana
2 Includes Superliga Colombiana, Recopa Sudamericana, FIFA Club World Cup, Supercopa Argentina,  Copa de la Superliga and Trofeo de Campeones de la Liga Profesional

International

Honours
Atlético Nacional
Categoría Primera A: 2011-I, 2013-I, 2013-II, 2014-I, 2015-II, 2017-I
Copa Colombia: 2012, 2013, 2016
Superliga Colombiana: 2012, 2016
Copa Libertadores: 2016
Recopa Sudamericana: 2017

River Plate
Argentine Primera División: 2021
Supercopa Argentina: 2017, 2019
Copa Libertadores: 2018; runner-up: 2019 
Recopa Sudamericana: 2019
Copa Argentina: 2019

Argentina
FIFA World Cup: 2022
Copa América: 2021
CONMEBOL–UEFA Cup of Champions: 2022

References

External links

1986 births
Living people
People from Casilda
Argentine sportspeople of Italian descent
Argentine footballers
Argentina international footballers
Argentine expatriate footballers
Argentine Primera División players
Primera Nacional players
Categoría Primera A players
Ferro Carril Oeste footballers
Deportivo Merlo footballers
Atlético Nacional footballers
Club Atlético River Plate footballers
Expatriate footballers in Colombia
Argentine expatriate sportspeople in Colombia
2018 FIFA World Cup players
2019 Copa América players
2021 Copa América players
2022 FIFA World Cup players
Association football goalkeepers
Copa América-winning players
Copa Libertadores-winning players
FIFA World Cup-winning players
Sportspeople from Santa Fe Province